Sul Brasil is a municipality in the state of Santa Catarina in the South region of Brazil. It was created in 1961 by division of the municipality of Modelo.

See also
List of municipalities in Santa Catarina

References

Municipalities in Santa Catarina (state)